Cats & Dogs is the second studio album by American rapper Evidence, released on September 27, 2011. It was his first release since signing with the Minneapolis-based label Rhymesayers. The album won the 2011 HHUG Best Album of the Year award.

Recording for the album began in 2008.

The first single from the album, "To Be Continued...", was not initially intended to be included on the album, but due to a positive response after its leak by the DJ Premier on Sirius' HipHopNation, the song was included.

There is no track 13. Evidence speaks on it, "There is no track 13 on purpose. The first line of To Be Continued starts '10 commandments, 24 hours, the 13th floor was missing from the towers'. The Masons, any buildings built by them leave the 13th floor out. 13 is not just a lucky number, but an unlucky number too. People use it both ways. For me to leave it [the 13th track] blank and then explain why in the first line of the next track [To Be Continued] to me is genius. I don’t think there’s ever been a missing 13th track on an album, ever."

Commercial performance
The album debuted at number 64 on the Billboard 200 with 7,700 copies sold in its first week.

Track listing

Charts

References

Evidence (musician) albums
Rhymesayers Entertainment albums
Albums produced by DJ Premier
2011 albums
Albums produced by the Alchemist (musician)
Albums produced by Statik Selektah
Albums produced by Evidence (musician)